Jean Baptiste Gaspard Roux de Rochelle (26 March 1762 – March 1849) was a French geographer, writer, poet and ambassador to the U.S.

Ambassador 
Born in Lons-le-Saunier, Roux de Rochelle was head of division at the Ministry of Foreign Affairs, then was appointed Minister Plenipotentiary of France to Hamburg from 1826 to 1830, then to the United States in Washington, D.C. from 1830 to 1831.

Geographer 
He was a member of several learned and literary societies, including the Société de Géographie (of which he was for the third time the president of the Central Commission) and of the Société philotechniqne.

Roux de Rochelle died in Paris at approximatively age of 87.

Writer 
He wrote several geographical and historical works.
 Les Trois âges, ou les Jeux olympiques, l'Amphithéâtre et la Chevalerie, poems in VI chants, with notes. Paris, F. Didot, 1816.
Recueil de voyages et de mémoires including Voyages de Marco Polo, Paris, 1824
 La Byzanciade, poem (epic, in XIV chants). Paris, F. Didot et fils , 1822.
 Lettres des États-Unis, 1835
 Les États-Unis, (Histoire de ces États). Paris, F. Didot fr., 1836.
 Histoire du Régiment de Champagne, F. Didot, Paris, 1839
 Épopée de Fernan Cortes
 Villes Anséatiques, Firmin Didot, Paris, 1844
 Histoire d'Italie, F. Didot, Paris, 1847

References

External links 
Portrait peint de Roux de Rochelle
Joseph Marie Quérard, La France littéraire: ou Dictionnaire bibliographique des savants, Firmin Didot, Paris, 1836.
Recueil de voyages et mémoires

Ambassadors of France to the United States
French geographers
19th-century geographers
19th-century French historians
19th-century French writers
19th-century French poets
People from Lons-le-Saunier
1762 births
1849 deaths